Sanjay Balraj Dutt (born 29 July 1959) is an Indian actor who primarily works in Hindi cinema. In a career spanning over four decades, Dutt has won several accolades and acted in over 100 films, ranging from romance to comedy genres, though usually in action genres, thus proving himself one of the most popular Hindi film actors since the 1980s.

Part of the Dutt family, he is the son of actors Sunil Dutt and Nargis. Dutt made his acting debut with Rocky (1981). A career downturn followed, with the exception of the crime thriller Naam (1986), a milestone in his career. He later established himself as a prolific star with films like Saajan (1991), Sadak (1991), Khalnayak (1993), Aatish (1994), Andolan (1995), Daag (1999), Haseena Maan Jaayegi (1999), Vaastav: The Reality (1999) and Mission Kashmir (2000). His critically acclaimed performance in Vaastav (1999) won him the Filmfare Award for Best Actor.

Dutt gained widespread acclaim for playing Munna Bhai in the Munna Bhai series (2003–2006), his most iconic role, and his biggest sole commercial success ever. Since 2000, he was cast in notable films like Jodi No.1 (2001), Munna Bhai MBBS (2003), Parineeta (2005), Dus (2005), Lage Raho Munna Bhai (2006), Shootout at Lokhandwala (2007), Dhamaal (2007), All the Best (2009), Double Dhamaal (2011), Agneepath (2012), Son of Sardaar (2012), and PK (2014). This was followed by another major career downturn with the exception of Kannada film K.G.F: Chapter 2 (2022), the third highest-grossing Indian film, in which he played the main antagonist.

Dutt was arrested under the TADA and the Arms Act in April 1993 and was convicted later for violation of Arms Act for possession of illegal weapons procured from other accused in the 1993 Bombay bombings. After serving his sentence, he was released in 2016. Dutt's life receives considerable media coverage in India, and in 2018, Sanju, a biopic based on his life (which also saw a special appearance by him), starring Ranbir Kapoor as Dutt, was released to positive reviews and emerged as one of the highest-grossers of Indian cinema.

Early life 
Dutt was born in Bombay City, Bombay State, Republic of India to parents who were noted Hindi cinema actors Sunil Dutt and Nargis Dutt. Born to a Punjabi Hindu Mohyal Brahmin father and Muslim mother of Punjabi descent, Dutt's ancestry can be traced back to the Rawalpindi Division of West Punjab. Sanjay has two sisters, Priya Dutt and Namrata Dutt. Sanjay's name was chosen by crowdsourcing via the Urdu language film magazine Shama. His mother died in 1981, shortly before his debut film's premiere; her death is cited as the instigator of his drug abuse.

Dutt made his acting debut at an early age, playing a Qawali singer in his father's film Reshma Aur Shera (1971).

Career

Early career and breakthrough (1981–1988) 
Dutt made his Bollywood film debut with the box-office super hit Rocky in 1981. Dutt then went on to star in Vidhaata, the highest-grossing Hindi film of 1982,  along with film veterans Dilip Kumar, Shammi Kapoor and Sanjeev Kumar. He also starred in movies like Main Awara Hoon (1983). In 1985, he shot Jaan Ki Baazi, his first film in two years.

The 1986 film Naam was a turning point in Dutt's career, it was a major critical and commercial success. Dutt appeared in successful films throughout the '80s such as Imaandaar, Inaam Dus Hazaar, Jeete Hain Shaan Se (1988), Mardon Wali Baat (1988), Ilaaka (1989), Hum Bhi Insaan Hain (1989), Kanoon Apna Apna (1989) and Taaqatwar.

Rise to stardom (1989–1993) 
 
His performances in both Kabzaa (1988) and J. P. Dutta's Hathyar (1989) were both well received by critics, although both films only managed average collections at the box office. In the late 1980s, he was seen in a number of multi-starrers alongside leading actors like Govinda, Mithun, Dharmendra, Jackie Shroff and Sunny Deol.

His successes continued in the 1990s, with films that include Tejaa, Khatarnaak, Zahreelay, Thanedaar, Khoon Ka Karz, Yalgaar, Gumrah, Sahibaan and Aatish: Feel the Fire. He went on to star in some of the most era-defining Indian films of the early 1990s such as Sadak, Saajan (for which he was nominated for the Filmfare Award for Best Actor) and Khalnayak, for which he earned his second Filmfare Award for Best Actor nomination.

The Hindu wrote that "Dutt's earlier films (like Naam and Sadak) got him a lot of favourable attention", and "Saajan established Dutt as the conventional soft hero."Saajan was the highest-grossing Bollywood film of 1991, and Sadak was the fifth highest grosser of 1991. Khalnayak became a blockbuster and was the second-highest grosser of 1993. This was followed by another box office success Gumrah, this was Dutt's second consecutive hit of the year.

Arrest due to involvement in 1993 serial bombings, films after arrest (1993–1999) 
Bombay (now Mumbai) suffered a series of serial bombings in 1993. Dutt was among several people associated with Bollywood who were accused of involvement. It was alleged that Dutt accepted delivery of weapons at his house from Abu Salem and co-accused Riyaz Siddiqui, who had also been implicated in relation to the Mumbai blasts. It was claimed that the weapons formed a part of a large consignment of arms connected to the terrorists. Dutt, however, in his confession stated that he took only one Type-56 from the producers of his movie Sanam, for his own family protection. It has also been reported that Sanjay Dutt's father Sunil Dutt's political rivalry caused Sanjay Dutt's conviction. Dutt's first film after his 1993 arrest was Daud (1997). It did average business at the box office despite getting a lot of publicity. This was followed by Dushman which did well financially.

Comeback (1999–2003) 

1999 was an excellent year for Dutt and one that is regarded as his comeback, with all of his five releases being amongst the highest-grossing films of that year. He began it by starring in the Mahesh Bhatt-directed film Kartoos, followed by Khoobsurat, Haseena Maan Jaayegi, Daag: The Fire and Vaastav: The Reality, for which he won many awards, including his first Filmfare Award for Best Actor. His role in 2000's Mission Kashmir won him critical acclaim and a number of awards and nominations. Dutt was also invited by the President of India to Rashtrapati Bhavan for his performance in the film.

Breakthrough with Munna Bhai M.B.B.S., prolonged success (2003–present) 
As the decade went on, he continued to play lead roles in critical and commercial successes such as Jodi No.1 (2001), Pitaah (2002), Kaante (2002) and the National Award-winning film Munna Bhai M.B.B.S. (2003), which garnered him several awards. At the box office, Munna Bhai M.B.B.S. achieved a silver jubilee status (25-week run) being one of only eight films to have achieved this status since the year 2000. In its 26th week of release, the film could still be found playing on 257 screens throughout India. Later successes came with Musafir (2004), Plan (2004), Parineeta (2005) and Dus (2005). He also won critical acclaim for his performances in Shabd (2005) and Zinda.

The sequel of Munna Bhai M.B.B.S., Lage Raho Munna Bhai was released on 1 September 2006, for which Dutt received a number of awards, along with an award from the Prime Minister Manmohan Singh for his work in the Munna Bhai series. NDTV India counted the character Munna Bhai as one of top 20 fictional characters in Bollywood. Later Dutt starred in movies like Dhamaal (2007), Shootout at Lokhandwala (2007), All the Best (2009), Double Dhamaal (2011), Son of Sardaar (2012) Agneepath (2012) and PK.

In January 2008, the Indian film Institute Filmfare listed 12 films featuring Dutt in its list of the top 100 highest-grossing movies of all time. In its May 2013 edition "100 years of Indian cinema", Filmfare listed three films featuring Dutt in its top 20 list of highest-grossing Hindi films of all time, adjusted for inflation these films were Lage Raho Munna Bhai, Khalnayak and Saajan.

Vidhu Vinod Chopra on 29 September 2016 announced that the third part of Munna Bhai series, starring Dutt in the title role, would begin soon. In 2017, Dutt appeared as the lead in Bhoomi, directed by Omung Kumar. In 2018, he starred in Saheb, Biwi Aur Gangster 3. In 2018, it was also announced that Dutt would feature alongside Ranbir Kapoor and Vaani Kapoor in Shamshera, which will release on 22 July 2022. On 29 June 2018, his biopic Sanju released in which he made a special appearance. Dutt appeared alongside Alia Bhatt and Aditya Roy Kapur in Sadak 2 in 2019. The film was universally panned and some claimed it to be one of the worst films in Dutt's career. In 2019, he joined the cast of historical film Bhuj: The Pride of India, which featured an ensemble cast consisting of Ajay Devgn, Sonakshi Sinha and Nora Fatehi. He was seen in the film Prassthanam on 20 September 2019.
Dutt played Adheera, the main antagonist in K.G.F: Chapter 2, the sequel to the blockbuster Kannada film, K.G.F: Chapter 1, marking his debut in Kannada cinema. The movie, as of June 2022, is the third highest grossing Indian film. Dutt also appeared in Toolsidas Junior, a sports drama and Samrat Prithviraj, alongside Akshay Kumar in the latter. His upcoming films include The Good Maharaja and Ghudchadi, where he will reunite with Raveena Tandon in the latter. Dutt will also be playing a key role in Lokesh Kanagaraj's Leo, alongside Vijay, which will mark his debut in Tamil cinema.

Off-screen work 
Dutt co-hosted the fifth season of the Indian reality show Bigg Boss along with Salman Khan. The show aired on Colors television from 2 October 2011 to 7 January 2012. Dutt later said it was Khan who persuaded him to co-host the show. Dutt and entrepreneur Indian Premier League cricket team owner Raj Kundra together launched India's first professionally organised mixed martial arts league—the Super Fight League—on 16 January 2012.

Personal life 

In the early 1980s, Dutt had a relationship with his co-star from his first film, Tina Munim. After this relationship ended, Dutt married actress Richa Sharma in 1987. She died of a brain tumour in 1996. The couple have a daughter, Trishala Dutt, born in 1988, who lives in the United States with her maternal grandparents.

Dutt's second marriage was to air-hostess-turned-model Rhea Pillai on 14 February 1998. The divorce finalised in 2008. Dutt married Manyata (born Dilnawaz Sheikh) first registered in Goa in 2008 and then, in a Hindu ceremony in Mumbai, after two years of dating. On 21 October 2010, he became a father to twins, a boy and a girl.

Health issues 
Dutt was diagnosed with stage 3 lung cancer in August 2020. He took treatment in Mumbai and now recovered from lung cancer.

Filmography

Awards and nominations

Controversies 

Bombay suffered a series of serial bombings in 1993. Dutt was among several people associated with Bollywood who were accused of involvement. It was alleged that Dutt accepted a delivery of weapons at his house from Abu Salem and co-accused Riyaz Siddiqui, who had also been implicated in relation to the Bombay blasts. It was claimed that the weapons formed a part of a large consignment of arms connected to the terrorists. Dutt, however, in his confession stated that he took only one Type-56 from the producers of his movie Sanam, for his own family protection. It has also been reported that Sanjay Dutt's father Sunil Dutt's political rivalry caused Sanjay Dutt's conviction.

In April 1993, after initial reporting by Baljeet Parmar on Dutt's possession of the AK-56, he was arrested under the provisions of the Terrorist and Disruptive Activities (Prevention) Act (TADA). Dutt was granted bail by the Supreme Court of India on 5 May 1993; however, on 4 July 1994 his bail was cancelled and he was re-arrested. On 16 October 1995 he was granted bail. Abdul Qayyum Abdul Karim Shaikh, who was thought to be a close aide of the terrorists' ringleader, Dawood Ibrahim, was arrested. Dutt had given Qayuum's name to the police when confessing to arms possession, saying that in September 1992 he had bought a pistol from Qayuum in Dubai. His arrest coincided with the release of his film, Khalnayak, in which he played a wanted criminal. The film's major success was in part due to Dutt's off-screen legal controversy.

On 31 July 2007, Dutt was cleared of the charges relating to the Mumbai blast; however, the TADA court sentenced Dutt to six years' rigorous imprisonment under Arms act for illegal possession of weapons. According to The Guardian, "The actor claimed he feared for his life after the notorious 'Black Friday' bombings, which were allegedly staged by Mumbai's Muslim-dominated mafia in retaliation for deadly Hindu-Muslim clashes a few months earlier. But the judge rejected this defence and also refused bail." Dutt was returned to at the Arthur Road Jail and soon after moved to the Yerawada Central Jail in Pune. Dutt appealed against the sentence and was granted interim bail on 20 August 2007 until such time as the TADA court provided him with a copy of its judgement. On 22 October 2007 Dutt was back in jail but again applied for bail. On 27 November 2007, Dutt was granted bail by the Supreme Court. On 21 March 2013 the Supreme Court upheld the verdict but shortened the sentence to five years' imprisonment. Dutt was given a month to surrender before the authorities.

Dutt has said that "I am not a politician but I belong to a political family." He was persuaded by a close friend to contest the 2009 Lok Sabha elections as a candidate for the Samajwadi Party, but withdrew when the court refused to suspend his conviction. He was then appointed General Secretary of the Samajwadi Party, leaving that post in December 2010. In March 2013 the Supreme Court upheld Dutt's five-year sentence, 18 months of which he already spent in jail during the trial. He was given four weeks to surrender to the authorities, the court having refused to release him on probation due to the severity of the offence.

On 10 May, the Supreme Court rejected Dutt's review petition for the reconsideration of his conviction and asked him to surrender on the stipulated date. on 14 May, Dutt withdrew the mercy plea and surrendered to the Mumbai Police on 16 May 2013. Just before the surrender, the Mumbai jail authority got an anonymous letter threatening Dutt's life. Dutt filed an appeal to allow him to surrender before entering Yerwada Central Jail. Later, Dutt withdrew this request too. He was paroled from 21 December 2013. The parole was extended three times until March 2014, raising concern in Bombay High Court and a proposal from the Government of Maharashtra to amend the law of parole. He returned to Yerwada Central Jail after his parole ended. Dutt was out on a two weeks' furlough granted by the Yerwada Central Jail authorities on 24 December.  He was subsequently incarcerated in Yerwada Central Jail, to complete his jail term. He was released from there on 25 February 2016 after serving his sentence.

In popular culture 
 The author Yasser Usman published a biographical book on Dutt, titled Sanjay Dutt: The Crazy Untold Story of Bollywood's Bad Boy, in 2018.
 Sanju is a 2018 Hindi film, based on Dutt's life. Dutt's role was essayed by actor Ranbir Kapoor.
 In 2021, Punjabi Singer from Brampton, Sidhu Moose Wala had also made a song Sanju, comparing his AK-47 possession and firing case with Sanjay Dutt.

Bibliography

References

External links 

 
 
 

 
Male actors in Hindi cinema
Living people
1959 births
Filmfare Awards winners
Screen Awards winners
International Indian Film Academy Awards winners
Zee Cine Awards winners
Indian male child actors
Indian male singers
Lawrence School, Sanawar alumni
Politicians from Mumbai
Samajwadi Party politicians
Male actors from Mumbai
Film producers from Mumbai
Indian actor-politicians
Bigg Boss
Indian game show hosts
Punjabi people
20th-century Indian male actors
21st-century Indian male actors
Hindi film producers
Indian criminals
Indian Hindus
Prisoners and detainees of Maharashtra
Indian people imprisoned on charges of terrorism
1993 Bombay bombings
People convicted on terrorism charges
Punjabi Hindus